Slovenian Women's Union of America (SWUA) is an ethnic fraternal benefit and social organization for Slovene immigrant women and their descendants in the United States. Founded in 1926 as Slovenska ženska zveza Amerike, its original purpose was to advocate for the rights of Slovenian women in the United States.  Currently the society preserves the traditions, language, and culture of their ancestors.  The society is headquartered in Joliet, Illinois, and publishes a magazine called Zarja (The Dawn in English).  Currently the society is known as the Slovenian Union of America.

See also 
Slovenian Americans

External links
SWUA Homepage
Slovenian Americans

Slovene-American culture in Illinois